Ciocani is a commune in Vaslui County, Western Moldavia, Romania. It is composed of four villages: Ciocani, Crâng, Crângu Nou and Podu Pietriș. These were part of Perieni Commune until 2004, when they were split off.

References

Communes in Vaslui County
Localities in Western Moldavia